David Kelly (Born November 8, 1956) is an  American politician who has served as a Delegate from the 6th district to the West Virginia House of Delegates since 2020. Kelly is a Republican.

Early life, education, and career
Kelly was born in Petersburg, West Virginia to Darlene Dotson Kelly and John E. Kelly. He has a PhD in divinity. Kelly served 20 years in law enforcement, including two terms as a sheriff. He also served as the Tyler County commissioner before running to be a delegate.

Elections

2018
In his primary, Kelly defeated fellow Republican Alex King with 53.05% of the vote to earn the nomination.

Kelly defeated Democrat T. Chris Combs and Independent J. Scott Beaver with 67.05% of the vote in the general election.

2020
In his second primary election, Kelly ran unopposed.

Kelly defeated Democrat Cindy Welch with 72.70% of the vote to win reelection in the general election.

Tenure

Committee assignments
Select Committee on Prevention and Treatment of Substance Abuse (Chair)
Agriculture and Natural Resources
Judiciary
Veterans Affairs and Homeland Security

Kelly is the Assistant Majority Whip in the Republican-controlled House of Delegates.

Kelly has a 77% lifetime rating from the American Conservative Union. He also has a B- rating from the West Virginia Citizens Defense League, a gun rights organization, as of 2020. Kelly had a 16% rating from the West Virginia chapter of the Sierra Club as of 2020.

Personal life
Kelly is married to Jan Kelly and has four children. He is a Protestant.

References

1956 births
21st-century American politicians
Living people
West Virginia Republicans